HMS Bootle has been the name of two Royal Navy vessels, after the English town. 

 , a  minesweeper launched 1918, sold 1923. Renamed from Buckie prior to launch.
 , a  launched 1941, sold 1948. Arrived at Charlestown in June 1949 for breaking up.

References

Royal Navy ship names